David Loucka is an American screenwriter, active in the comedy and horror genres.

Writing credits
Monsters (TV episode "Holly's House", 1988)
The Dream Team (1989)
Working Tra$h (TV 1990)
Eddie (1996)
Borderline (2002)
Dream House (2011)
House at the End of the Street (2012)
Rings (2017)

References

External links
 

Year of birth missing (living people)
Living people
American screenwriters